Lagardère may refer to:

 Lagardère Group, a French media group
 Jean-Luc Lagardère (1928–2003), French engineer and businessman and CEO of the Lagardère Group
 Arnaud Lagardère (born 1961), French businessman and son of Jean-Luc Lagardère
 Lagardère, Gers, a commune of the Gers département, France
Henri de Lagardère, a character created by Paul Féval
 Lagardère (film), a 2003 TV movie featuring the Paul Féval character